Arthur William Sour, Jr., known as Art Sour (November 6, 1924 – January 10, 2000), was a Shreveport petroleum and real estate businessman, who was a pioneer in the development of a  competitive Republican Party in his native U.S. state of Louisiana.

Background
Sour was a son of Arthur W. Sour (1895–1972), a native of Gretna in Jefferson Parish,
and the former Adele Elizabeth Diez (1897–1977), a native of Reserve in St. John the Baptist Parish. One of Sour's sisters, Louise Pasquier, the widow of Charles F. Pasquier, Sr., was among the founders of St. Joseph Catholic Church in Shreveport. Another sister, Adele Hoisington (1917-1945), named for her mother, was a former bank employee, who died with her husband, Earl L. Hoisington (1910-1945), in an automobile accident near Willard in Huron County in northern Ohio, while the couple was on their honeymoon. Adele and Earl Hoisington are interred at Forest Park East Cemetery in Shreveport.

References

Arthur W. Sour, Jr., obituary, Shreveport Times, January 11, 2000

 

1924 births
2000 deaths
Republican Party members of the Louisiana House of Representatives
United States Army personnel of World War II
Politicians from Shreveport, Louisiana
C. E. Byrd High School alumni
United States Army soldiers
Businesspeople from Louisiana
American real estate businesspeople
20th-century American businesspeople
20th-century American politicians
Catholics from Louisiana